The Blackpool branch lines are two railway branch lines running from the West Coast Main Line at Preston to Blackpool: The main branch which is double track and electrified, runs to Blackpool North station (Blackpool's main passenger station) via . A second branch, which is single track and unelectrified, diverges from the main branch at Kirkham and Wesham junction, running on a southerly route to Blackpool South station via .

The Preston to Blackpool North route was re-signalled and electrified with overhead wires at 25kV AC, with electric trains starting running from the May 2018 timetable change.

Previously there was also a central branch running from Kirkham to  station; this was closed in the 1960s.

History

The lines around Blackpool were mostly opened in stages by the Preston and Wyre Joint Railway from 1840.

Preston to Blackpool North
The route is used by the bulk of Blackpool's passenger trains, providing services to Manchester, Liverpool and Leeds as well as other destinations. The planned electrification of the Manchester-to-Blackpool North route was announced in December 2009, and completed in May 2018.

Avanti West Coast runs direct services between Blackpool North and London Euston using  Pendolinos, which will be supplemented by the Class 807 Hitachi AT300 from 2023.

First TransPennine Express formerly ran hourly services to Manchester Airport using Class 185 diesel multiple units, but responsibility for these passed to the new Northern franchise as from the beginning of April 2016.

Preston to Blackpool South - South Fylde Line
Known as the South Fylde Line this branch serves Lytham and St Annes as well as Blackpool Pleasure Beach, each with their own station. It follows the Preston to Blackpool North line as far as Kirkham Junction. Currently one service per hour runs along this branch, with most trains running beyond Preston to  via the East Lancashire line (though only advertised as through running on Sundays). The line from Kirkham to Blackpool South was reduced from double to single track in the early-1980s - as there are no intermediate passing loops, only one train can use the branch at a time, meaning the route has limited capacity. Until 1964, it ran further north into Blackpool to serve Blackpool Central station.

In 2021, Fylde Council submitted a report to the Department of Transport, proposing a new passing loop which could double the frequency of the current hourly service. It also proposed that the line be used as a 'test bed' for affordable electrification of secondary railway lines.

Kirkham to Blackpool Central
As well as the line via Blackpool South, a flyover junction at Kirkham and Wesham provided direct access to Blackpool Central station. Blackpool Central station closed in 1964 and its site is now where the Central Car Park stands; the trackbed and embankment has been used for the road Yeadon Way (built in the 1980s), which provides direct access from the M55. The first two miles of the M55 also occupy the former trackbed, until the Blackpool North line travels under the motorway at the point where the lines used to merge.

Poulton to Fleetwood 

The Fleetwood Branch Line diverged at Poulton, but the junction has now been removed during the recent trackwork. This served the industrial areas and ports around Fleetwood and used to carry passenger traffic to the town until 1970. With the exception of two small sections, the line is still in place from Poulton-le-Fylde to Jameson Rd, Fleetwood, where the trackbed was used to build the A585 (Amounderness Way). Proposals exist to reopen the line in the future, as a large amount of track still remains and volunteers have begun to clear the line of the vegetation with which it was previously overgrown.  In 2017, the junction of the line to the mainline to Blackpool was lifted, making it less likely that the line will be re-instated.

Electrification
The electrification of the Manchester-to-Blackpool North route was announced in December 2009. The main work to accomplish this commenced in early 2017. Bridgeworks along the route to raise and rebuild those that had insufficient clearance for overhead wires was completed first. Services over both the Blackpool South and Blackpool North branches temporarily ceased on 11 November 2017, to allow the track layout at Blackpool North and Kirkham to be remodelled and a third platform at Kirkham and Wesham station constructed (along with other facility improvements). Both lines were re-signalled, and overhead line installation took place on the Preston-to-Blackpool North section; the completion date was 16 April 2018, enabling electric trains to run from May 2018. Services to Blackpool South resumed on 29 January 2018, and the line to Blackpool North re-opened on 16 April 2018, with electric trains operating from the 20 May 2018 timetable change using Class 319 and Class 390 Electric multiple units.

See also 
 Fleetwood Branch Line
 Preston and Wyre Joint Railway

References

Rail transport in Lancashire
Railway lines in North West England
Transport in Blackpool
Transport in the City of Preston
Standard gauge railways in England